Gunnar Halle (born 11 August 1965) is a Norwegian football manager and former player who played as a right back. He is the current assistant coach of Strømmen. Halle is best known for his playing spells at Oldham Athletic and Leeds United, followed by his brief managerial spell at Lyn Oslo.

Halle played professionally in England and for the Norwegian national team. In total he was capped 64 times and scored five international goals, including a memorable hat-trick against San Marino, and was included in the squads for the 1994 FIFA World Cup and 1998 FIFA World Cup.

Playing career
Born in Larvik, Halle started his youth career in local club Nesjar.

Halle started his Norwegian Premier League career in Lillestrøm in 1985 when he joined from Larvik Turn. He quickly became a team regular, and helped win the league titles in 1986 and 1989.

In the spring of 1991 he was sold to Oldham Athletic for £280,000, where he played over 200 matches and is regarded as one of the club's finest players during their Premiership days. He remains Oldham's most capped player, playing 25 times for Norway in his time there.

Halle joined Leeds United for £500,000 in the winter of 1996, where he competed with Gary Kelly for the club's regular right back spot. Halle had a successful time at Leeds under the management of George Graham and latterly David O'Leary. He spent three seasons at the club. In his final season, Halle helped Leeds finish fourth in the Premier League during the 1998–99 season and qualify for the UEFA Cup competition. However, in the summer of 1999, Leeds signed future England right back Danny Mills and Halle joined newly promoted local rivals Bradford City for £200k.

He spent a further three seasons at Bradford City, scoring twice against Darlington in the League Cup and Portsmouth in the league. A brief spell with Wolverhampton Wanderers concluded his stay in England. He returned to Norway with Lillestrøm in the summer of 2002.

Halle played one and a half seasons for Lillestrøm.

International career
In 1987 Halle made his debut for the Norwegian national team. He represented Norway in both the 1994 FIFA World Cup and 1998 FIFA World Cup's.

In total he was capped 64 times for Norway and scored five international goals, including a memorable hat-trick against San Marino.

Coaching career
Halle rounding off his playing career and began his coaching career as player-coach for Norwegian Third Division side Aurskog/Finstadbru in the 2004 season.

In the 2005 and 2006 seasons Halle worked as the Lillestrøm assistant coach, but was sacked on 13 November 2006 along with head coach Uwe Rösler. The pair were soon hired to coach Viking.

In December 2008, he moved to Lyn as assistant manager. In August 2009 he stepped up to manager following the termination of Kent Bergersen's contract. The club was relegated to First Division after the 2009 season and changed its name to FK Lyn before the 2010 season. On 30 June 2010 the club declared bankruptcy after several years of financial difficulty, forcing them to forfeit from the league. On 30 August 2010, he was named the new assistant coach of Molde FK, again under Rösler. The duo coached Molde throughout the season.

In February 2012, Halle was named as the new assistant coach of the Norway women's national football team under Eli Landsem. In 2013, he moved to Strømmen IF. Since 2015 he has been manager of various Norwiegan FA youth teams from under 15s to under 19s.

Honours
Lillestrøm SK
Norwegian Premier League Champions: 1986, 1989
Norwegian Premier League Runners Up: 1985, 1988
Norwegian Football Cup Winners: 1985
Norwegian Football Cup Runners Up: 1986
Oldham Athletic
English Second Division Champions: 1990–91
English FA Cup Semi Finalists: 1993–94

References

External links

1965 births
Living people
People from Larvik
Norwegian footballers
Norway international footballers
Larvik Turn players
Lillestrøm SK players
Oldham Athletic A.F.C. players
Leeds United F.C. players
Bradford City A.F.C. players
Wolverhampton Wanderers F.C. players
1994 FIFA World Cup players
1998 FIFA World Cup players
Eliteserien players
English Football League players
Premier League players
Norwegian expatriate footballers
Expatriate footballers in England
Norwegian expatriate sportspeople in England
Norwegian football managers
Lyn Fotball managers
Association football defenders
Strømmen IF managers
Sportspeople from Vestfold og Telemark